Sonic Highways World Tour was a concert tour by American rock band Foo Fighters, in support of their eighth studio album Sonic Highways. It began on December 10, 2014, in Cape Town, South Africa and continued through South America, Oceania, North America, Europe and Asia. The tour abruptly ended after the November 2015 Paris attacks which included the slaughter of fans and crew at a concert by fellow U.S. rock band Eagles of Death Metal. The band were playing in Bologna on the night of the attacks and had been due in Paris after leaving Italy.

Background
The tour marked Foo Fighters' first concerts ever in South Africa, Colombia and South Korea. On most concerts there was a B-stage, where first acoustic songs were played before the band launched into cover versions. One exception was Slane Castle in Ireland, where rainy conditions prevented the usage of said stage.

During the concert in Gothenburg, Sweden on June 12, 2015, the lead vocalist of the band, Dave Grohl, fell off the stage early in the set and fractured his leg, but the rest of the band decided to continue performing while Dave was attended to backstage by on-site medical staff, with the drummer Taylor Hawkins doing double-duty as lead vocalist. He returned to the stage just fifteen minutes later to finish the set in a chair and kept playing until the end of the concert. However, the remainder dates of the European leg was cancelled due to Dave's leg fracture. This cost the band as much as $10 million in lost fees and travel expenses not offset by box office revenue.

Many artists joined the band on stage during the tour, including Perry Farrell, Stevie Nicks, Red Hot Chili Peppers' Chad Smith, Rage Against the Machine's Brad Wilk, members from Zac Brown Band, Bad Brains, HAIM, Jewel, among others. After the cancellation of their Glastonbury's headlining concert, Dave said that he intended to ask Paul McCartney and Kanye West to join the band during the performance.

Opening acts

311 – 
Ash – 
BLK JKS – 
Comunidade Nin Jitsu – 
The Delta Riggs – 
Diamante Eléctrico – 
Dropkick Murphys – 
Eruca Sativa – 
Gary Clark Jr. – 
Ghost – 
God Damn – 
Hawk Eyes – 
Hozier – 
Honeyblood – 
Iggy Pop – 

Kaiser Chiefs – 
Los Mox! – 
Mighty Mighty Bosstones – 
Mission of Burma – 
Naked Raygun – 
Raimundos – 
Rise Against – 
Royal Blood – 
The Strypes – 
Teenage Fanclub – 
Trombone Shorty –

Songs Performed

Tour dates

Cancelled shows

Notes

Personnel
 Foo Fighters
Dave Grohl – lead vocals, backing vocals, rhythm guitar, lead guitar, drums
Pat Smear – rhythm guitar
Nate Mendel – bass
Taylor Hawkins – drums, backing vocals, lead vocals
Chris Shiflett – lead guitar, rhythm guitar, backing vocals
 Additional musicians
Rami Jaffee – keyboards, mellotron, accordion

References

2014 concert tours
2015 concert tours
Foo Fighters concert tours